Marjo Hannele Voutilainen (born 22 March 1981) is a Finnish retired ice hockey player and current head coach of Ilves Naiset in the Naisten Liiga (NSML). During her playing career, she competed internationally with the Finnish national team, winning a bronze medal at the 2010 Winter Olympics in Vancouver and at the IIHF World Women's Championships in 2008 and 2009.

Voutilainen previously served as head coach of KalPa Kuopio in the NSML during 2016 to 2022. She was named Naisten Liiga Coach of the Year for the 2019–20 season, after guiding KalPa to their best regular season finish ever, upon which they built the most successful playoff run in team history. In May 2022, it was announced that she had signed on as head coach with Ilves Naiset to fill the vacancy created when Linda Leppänen resigned from the position a month prior.

Career stats

See also
2009–10 Finland women's national ice hockey team
List of Olympic women's ice hockey players for Finland

References

External links
 
 
Marjo Voutilainen's profile, from http://www.vancouver2010.com; retrieved 2010-02-25.

1981 births
Living people
Finnish ice hockey coaches
Finnish women's ice hockey forwards
Ice hockey players at the 2002 Winter Olympics
Ice hockey players at the 2010 Winter Olympics
Medalists at the 2010 Winter Olympics
Naisten Liiga (ice hockey) coaches
Olympic bronze medalists for Finland
Olympic ice hockey players of Finland
Olympic medalists in ice hockey
People from Kuopio
KalPa Naiset players
Espoo Blues Naiset players
JYP Jyväskylä Naiset players
Sportspeople from North Savo